There are a number of Elementary schools named Adams Elementary School:

 Adams Elementary School (Santa Ana, California)
 Adams Elementary School (Corona, California)
 Adams Elementary School (Coon Rapids, Minnesota)
 Adams Elementary School (Cary, North Carolina) 
 Adams Elementary School (Midland, Michigan)
 Adams Elementary School (Seattle, Washington) 
 Adams Elementary School (Glen Allen, Virginia)
 Adams Elementary School (Cleburne, Texas)
 Adams Elementary School (Eugene, Oregon)